The 1961 football season was São Paulo's 32nd season since club's existence.

Overall

{|class="wikitable"
|-
|Games played || 73 (9 Torneio Rio-São Paulo, 30 Campeonato Paulista, 34 Friendly match)
|-
|Games won || 32 (2 Torneio Rio-São Paulo, 18 Campeonato Paulista, 12 Friendly match)
|-
|Games drawn || 17 (3 Torneio Rio-São Paulo,  5 Campeonato Paulista, 9 Friendly match)
|-
|Games lost || 24 (4 Torneio Rio-São Paulo,  7 Campeonato Paulista, 13 Friendly match)
|-
|Goals scored || 169
|-
|Goals conceded || 117
|-
|Goal difference || +52
|-
|Best result || 6–0 (H) v Portuguesa – Campeonato Paulista – 1961.12.10
|-
|Worst result || 1–5 (A) v Colo-Colo – Friendly match – 1961.01.28
|-
|Most appearances || 
|-
|Top scorer || 
|-

Friendlies

Official competitions

Torneio Rio-São Paulo

Record

Campeonato Paulista

Record

External links
official website 

Association football clubs 1961 season
1961
1961 in Brazilian football